The 2020–21 William & Mary Tribe men's basketball team represented the College of William & Mary in the 2020–21 NCAA Division I men's basketball season. The Tribe, led by second-year head coach Dane Fischer, play their home games at Kaplan Arena in Williamsburg, Virginia as members of the Colonial Athletic Association.

Previous season
The Tribe finished the 2019–20 season 21–11, 13–5 in CAA play to finish in second place. They were upset by Elon in the quarterfinals of the CAA tournament.

Offseason

Departures

2020 recruiting class

Roster

Schedule and results 

|-
!colspan=12 style=| Non-conference regular season

|-
!colspan=9 style=| CAA regular season

|-
!colspan=9 style=| CAA Tournament
|-

Source

References

William & Mary Tribe men's basketball seasons
William and Mary Tribe
William and Mary Tribe men's basketball
William and Mary Tribe men's basketball